Attention span is the amount of time spent concentrating on a task before becoming distracted. Distractibility occurs when attention is uncontrollably diverted to another activity or sensation. Attention training is said to be part of education, particularly in the way students are trained to remain focused on a topic of discussion for extended periods, developing listening and analytical skills in the process.

By age 
Measuring humans estimated attention span depends on what the attention is being used for. The terms “transient attention” and “selective sustained attention” are used to separate short term and focused attention. Transient attention is a short-term response to a stimulus that temporarily attracts or distracts attention. Researchers disagree on the exact amount of the human transient attention span, whereas selective sustained attention, also known as focused attention, is the level of attention that produces consistent results on a task over time. Common estimates of the attention span of healthy teenagers and adults range 5 hours. This is possible because people can choose repeatedly to re-focus on the same thing. This ability to renew attention permits people to 'pay attention' to things that last for more than a few minutes, such as lengthy films.

For children it is little different, older children are more capable of longer periods of attention than younger children. Average attention spans per age before 18 years old look like this:

 2 years old: 4 to 6 minutes
 4 years old: 8 to 12 minutes
 6 years old: 12 to 18 minutes
 8 years old: 16 to 24 minutes
 10 years old: 20 to 30 minutes
 12 years old: 24 to 36 minutes
 14 years old: 28 to 42 minutes
 16 years old: 32 to 48 minutes

For time-on-task measurements, the type of activity used in the test affects the results, as people are generally capable of a longer attention span when they are doing something that they find enjoyable or intrinsically motivating. Attention is also increased if the person is able to perform the task fluently, compared to a person who has difficulty performing the task, or to the same person when they are just learning the task. Fatigue, hunger, noise, and emotional stress reduce the time focused on the task. 

A research study that consisted of 10,430 males and females ages 10 to 70 observed sustained attention time across a lifespan. The study required participants to use a cognitive testing website where data was gathered for seven months. The data collected from the study concluded that attention span is not one singular linear equation; at age 15 it is recorded that attention-span-related abilities diverge. Over the course of the study, collected evidence additionally found that, in humans, attention span is at its highest level when a person is in their early 40s, then gradually declines in old age.

Measurement
Many different tests on attention span have been used in different populations and in different times. Some tests measure short-term, focused attention abilities (which is typically below normal in people with ADHD), and others provide information about how easily distracted the test-taker is (typically a significant problem in people with ADHD). Tests like the DeGangi's Test of Attention in Infants (TAI) and Wechsler Intelligence Scale for Children-IV (WISC-IV) are commonly used to test for attention-related issues in young children when interviews and observations are inadequate. Older tests, like the Continuous Performance Test and the Porteus Maze Test, have been rejected by some experts. These tests are typically criticized as not actually measuring attention, being inappropriate for some populations, or not providing clinically useful information.

Variability in test scores can be produced by small changes in the testing environment. For example, test-takers will usually remain on task for longer periods of time if the examiner is visibly present in the room than if the examiner is absent.

Testing 
In an early study of the influence of temperament on attention span, the mothers of 232 pairs of twins were interviewed periodically about the similarities and differences in behavior displayed by their twins during infancy and early childhood. The results showed that each of the behavioral variables (temper frequency, temper intensity, irritability, crying, and demanding attention) had a significant inverse relationship with attention span. In other words, the twin with longer attention span was better able to remain performing a particular activity without distraction, and was also the less temperamental twin.

One study of 2600 children found that early exposure to television (around age two) is associated with later attention problems such as inattention, impulsiveness, disorganization, and distractibility at age seven. This correlational study does not specify whether viewing television increases attention problems in children, or if children who are naturally prone to inattention are disproportionately attracted to the stimulation of television at young ages, or if there is some other factor, such as parenting skills, associated with this finding.

Furthermore, a study examining the relations between children’s attention span-persistence in preschool and later school achievement and college completion. In other words, this study is analyzing the importance of children’s early skills for predicting later developmental paths. For instance, children who enrolled in formal schooling without the ability to pay attention, remember instructions, and demonstrate self-control have more difficulty in elementary school and throughout high school. The research found that children’s age 4 attention span-persistence significantly predicted math and reading achievement at age 21 after controlling for achievement levels at age 7, adopted status, child vocabulary skills, gender, and maternal education level.

How well a parent can capture and keep a two-year-old's attention on a toy may be more important than just a pleasant way to pass the time. "By successfully focusing a young child's attention on objects during free play, parents may be giving their child practice in using attention as a way to shift into a positive emotional state". "We found that children whose parents actively directed and maintained their child's visual attention spent more time distracting themselves away from a source of distress."

See also 
 Attention
 Attention deficit hyperactivity disorder (ADHD)
 Attention restoration theory
 Flow
 Hyperfocus
 Mindfulness
 Subliminal stimuli

References 

Attention